Mount Sterling Municipal Airport is a public use airport located 2 miles west of Mount Sterling, Illinois. The airport is publicly owned.

The airport has one runway: runway 18/36 is 5905 x 75 ft (1800 x 23 m) and is asphalt.

For the 12-month period ending March 31, 2020, the airport had an average of 57 aircraft operations per week, or roughly 3000 per year. The traffic is 100% of general aviation. For the same time period, there are 10 aircraft based on the field: 9 single-engine and 1 jet.

Self-serve fuel is available at the airport from Dot Foods. The airport is not regularly attended.

The airport received $1.5 million from the State of Illinois as part of its Rebuild Illinois program during the COVID-19 pandemic to expand a taxiway. The airport hoped that an expanded taxiway would allow aircraft to stay off the runway longer, especially by allowing them to taxi to the runway's end without needing to turn around on the runway. preventing runway incursions that might otherwise happen with short or confusing taxiways. The airport also hopes to expand hangar space in the coming years.

References 

Airports in Illinois